The 2011 Nigerian Senate election in Ekiti State was held on April 9, 2011, to elect members of the Nigerian Senate to represent Ekiti State. Babafemi Ojudu representing Ekiti Central, Olubunmi Ayodeji Adetunmbi representing Ekiti North and Anthony Adeniyi representing Ekiti South all won on the platform of Action Congress of Nigeria.

Overview

Summary

Results

Ekiti Central 
Action Congress of Nigeria candidate Babafemi Ojudu won the election, defeating other party candidates.

Ekiti North 
Action Congress of Nigeria candidate Olubunmi Ayodeji Adetunmbi won the election, defeating other party candidates.

Ekiti South 
Action Congress of Nigeria candidate Anthony Adeniyi won the election, defeating party candidates.

References 

Ekiti State Senate elections
Ekiti State
Ogun State senatorial elections